Flotsam and Jetsam is a 2022 Taiwanese drama film written and directed by Chang Tso-chi.

Premise
A runaway girl, Hui-zhen, arrives at a seaside village to find her biological father she had never met before. There, she meets the mysterious teenager Liang and his family, and begins a journey of love and atonement.

Cast
 Chen Ming as Chen You-ming
 Fox Lee as Hui-zhen 
 Tung Liang-yu as Liang
 Chen Ying-ru
 Wu Wei-han
 Chang Che-kuei 
 Chung Shang-ting

Reception
The film received attention for its cinematography and emotional soundtrack.

Awards and nominations

References

External links
 
 

2022 films
2022 drama films
Taiwanese drama films
2020s Mandarin-language films
Taiwanese-language films
Film productions suspended due to the COVID-19 pandemic